Miss England is a national beauty pageant in England.

History
The contest, title owned by the Miss World organisation is organised each year by Angie Beasley, a winner of 25 beauty contests in the 1980s and has organised beauty pageants around the country on behalf of Miss World, including Miss United Kingdom, Miss England, Miss Scotland and Miss Wales.

The contest often attracts celebrity judges at local and national finals. Many celebrities have also judged the regional heats for the competition around the country including glamour model Jordan, who joined the judging panel for Miss Sussex.

The Miss England competition is promoted to thousands of women around England in local media by a series of area heats held around the country.

News of the World and Take a Break magazine have previously sponsored contestants over the years, writing features on contestants and used the winners on the front covers. Various newspapers, including the Daily Mirror, The Times, the Daily Mail and various magazines including Teen Vogue in New York and Hello! have carried stories on local and national winners.

The winner of the Miss England competition, along with the winners of Miss Northern Ireland, Miss Scotland and Miss Wales, can compete in Miss World. The highest ranking competitor of the four constituent country entrants is then presented with the title and crown of Miss United Kingdom.

The 2008 contest featured a plus-size model, Chloe Marshall and an active-duty member of the British Army, Katrina Hodge, both firsts for the pageant.

In 2022 Melisa Raouf became the first contestant to compete in a semi final of the contest without makeup, following the introduction of a "bare-face top model" round in 2019.

Winners
The title of Miss England 2011 was won by Alize Lily Mounter who was classed as the favourite to win the competition. Mounter would later compete in the Miss World 2011 where she was among the top seven contestants on the final night, finishing in 4th place. She was also awarded the title of Miss World Europe, a first for England, after finishing as the highest ranked delegate from Europe in the competition.

Carina Tyrrell, who was a medical student when she won her national title in 2014, competed in Miss World 2014 when the competition was held in her home country at ExCeL London. She would make the final cut and enter the top 5, also finishing in 4th place overall.

In 2017, Stephanie Hill represented England at the Miss World 2017 held in Sanya, China and became the first English delegate to make the top 3 in the competition by placing as the 2nd runner-up. Hill was also awarded the title of Miss World Europe after being the European contestant with the highest scores. This result makes Hill the most successful Miss England in the history of Miss World.

Titleholders

1928 to 1936

1953 to 1990
After winning the title of Miss England, winners would participate in Miss Universe, followed by the occasional Miss Europe, and finally Miss United Kingdom. In the event whereby a Miss England won the title of Miss United Kingdom, she would represent the United Kingdom in Miss World.

2000–present

Since 2000, winners of Miss England have been competing in Miss World.

See also 
 Miss Northern Ireland
 Miss Scotland
 Miss United Kingdom
 Miss Wales
 Miss Universe Great Britain
 Miss Great Britain

References

External links
 

Miss England
 
Beauty pageants in England
1928 establishments in England
Recurring events established in 1928
Annual events in England
England

fr:Miss Angleterre